The IEEE Reynold B. Johnson Information Storage Systems Award is  a Technical Field Award of the IEEE given each year to an individual, multiple recipients, or team up to three in number that has made outstanding contributions to information storage systems. The award is named in honor of Reynold B. Johnson. 

The award was established in 1991. The award includes a bronze medal, certificate, and honorarium. It was last awarded in 2015.

Recipients 

 2015: Dov Moran and Amir Ban and Simon Litsyn
 2014: John K. Ousterhout and Mendel Rosenblum
 2013: Michael L. Kazar
 2012: Naoya Takahashi
 2011: (no award)
 2010: Moshe Yanai
 2009: Marshall Kirk McKusick
 2008: Alan Jay Smith
 2007: David Hitz and James Lau
 2006: Jaishankar Menon
 2005: François B. Dolivo
 2004: Bruce A. Gurney and Virgil S. Speriosu
 2003: Neal Bertram
 2002: Christopher Henry Bajorek
 2001: Tu Chen
 2000: Mark Kryder
 1999: David Patterson and Randy Katz and Garth Gibson
 1998: Jean-Pierre Lazzari
 1997: Alan Shugart
 1996: Nobutake Imamura
 1995: James U. Lemke
 1994: Charles Denis Mee
 1993: John M. Harker

See also

 List of computer-related awards
 List of computer science awards

External links
Biographies of recipients from 2002-2015

References

Reynold B. Johnson Information Storage Systems Award
Computer-related awards
Information science awards